Alsop en le Dale is a village in Derbyshire, England about  north of Ashbourne close to the Staffordshire border, and a mile from Dovedale, a popular tourist location within the Peak District national park. It is within the civil parish of Eaton and Alsop.

Toponymy 
The derivation of “Alsop en le Dale” is the product of a two-stage process: “Alsop” originates from “Ælli’s little valley” (Old English hop), whilst en le Dale is from the Old French for “in the” and the Old English dœl (valley).

History 
Comprising a few cottages and scattered farms, the village was mentioned in the Domesday Book under Derbyshire in the lands belonging to the king. The book which was written in 1086 said:
After the Norman Conquest, Henry de Ferrers, one of William the Conqueror's generals was granted land in Derbyshire. He in turn offered the township of Alsop-le-Dale to one of his officers Gamellus who became known as Gamellus de Alsop. The Alsop family owned the estate of Alsop-en-le-Dale from the 12th century to the late 17th century, when Anthony Alsop's creditors forced the sale of the estate to meet his debts, some of which was passed to Sir Phillip Gell. During the 18th century the Allsopps of Derby and Worcester were proprietors of Samuel Allsopp & Sons, a Burton-on-Trent based brewery, and Henry Allsopp, 1st Baron Hindlip claimed that they were descended from the Alsops. While a connection between Anthony Alsop (c.1618-91) of Alsop-en-le-Dale and Samuel Allsopp (d. 1728/9) of Derby is yet to be proven, but a family relation is plausible.

In the last decade of the 19th century, according to directories and gazetteers of the time, Alsop Hall was the residence of John Hall (J.P.) and principal landowners were the Duke of Rutland, Baron Hindlip (who was lord of the manor). and W. Dean.

Community & leisure 
Alsop Hall opposite the church, was built in the late 16th century for the Alsop family.

The village formerly had a station on the railway line connecting Ashbourne and Buxton. Located to the west and above the village, the station is a now a car-park and access point for the Tissington Trail, a  bridleway and walk/cycle path that utilizes this section of the line. Opened in 1971, it is part of the National Cycle Network.

The village is a convenient starting point for walks into Wolfscote Dale, which lies on the River Dove between Dovedale and Hartington village.

Religious sites 
The Church of St. Michael and All Angels is of Norman origin, but was restored in the 19th century. The church serves the hamlets of Alsop Moor, Cold Eaton and Newton Grange.

See also
Listed buildings in Eaton and Alsop

References

External links

Memorial inscriptions in the church & churchyard
 

Villages in Derbyshire
Towns and villages of the Peak District
Derbyshire Dales